Rhostyllen Football Club is a Welsh football club from Rhostyllen in Wrexham County Borough. The club was founded in 2015 and plays in the Ardal Leagues North West, which is at tier 3 of the Welsh football pyramid.

History
The first football club in Rhostyllen dates back to 1879 and existed until 1881. The Club then reformed as Rhostyllen Victoria in 1881 and contested the Welsh Cup. On 15 April 1889 during a match between Wales and Scotland at The Racecourse, Wrexham, Alf Pugh, a Rhostyllen Victoria player, became the first ever player to be substituted in international football.
  
The current incarnation were formed in 2015, and began playing in the 2015–16 season in the North East Wales League, a competition which it won.

The following season, the team achieved second consecutive promotion when it finished second in the Welsh National League Division One.

Seasons

Honours

League
Welsh National League Division One
Runner Up (1): 2017

North East Wales Football League
Winner (1): 2016

Cups
North East Wales FA Junior (Horace Wynne) Cup
Winner (1): 2016

Welsh National League Division One League Cup
Winner (1): 2017

References

Welsh National League (Wrexham Area) Premier Division clubs
2015 establishments in Wales
Association football clubs established in 2015
Football clubs in Wales
Football clubs in Wrexham
Ardal Leagues clubs
Clwyd East Football League clubs